Thomas Jones (23 June 1756 – 18 July 1807) was Head Tutor at Trinity College, Cambridge, for twenty years and an outstanding teacher of mathematics. He is notable as a mentor of Adam Sedgwick.

Biography
Jones was born at Berriew, Montgomeryshire, in Wales.

On completing his studies at Shrewsbury School, Jones was admitted to St John's College, Cambridge, on 28 May 1774, as a 'pensioner' (i.e. a fee-paying student, as opposed to a scholar or sizar). He was believed to be an illegitimate son of Mr Owen Owen, of Tyncoed, and his housekeeper, who afterwards married a Mr Jones, of Traffin, County Kerry, Thomas then being brought up as his son.

On 27 June 1776, Jones migrated from St John's College to Trinity College. He became a scholar in 1777 and obtained his BA in 1779, winning the First Smith's Prize and becoming Senior Wrangler. In 1782, he obtained his MA and became a Fellow of Trinity College in 1781. He became a Junior Dean, 1787–1789 and a Tutor, 1787–1807. He was ordained a deacon at the Peterborough parish on 18 June 1780. Then he was ordained priest, at the Ely parish on 6 June 1784, canon of Fen Ditton, Cambridgeshire, in 1784, and then canon of Swaffham Prior, also 1784. On 11 December 1791, he preached before the university, at Great St Mary's, a sermon against duelling (from Exodus XX. 13), which was prompted by a duel that had lately taken place near Newmarket between Henry Applewhaite and Richard Ryecroft, undergraduates of Pembroke, in which the latter was fatally wounded. Jones died on 18 July 1807, in lodgings in Edgware Road, London. He is buried in the cemetery of Dulwich College. A bust and a memorial tablet are in the ante-chapel of Trinity College.

His academic mentor was John Cranke (1746–1816). His Cambridge tutor was Thomas Postlethwaite.

Notes

References
 Dictionary of National Biography, Smith, Elder & Co., 1908–1986, vol. 10, pp. 1055–1056.
 J. Wilkes, Encyclopedia Londinensis, Eds. J. Jones and J. Adlard, 1810–1829, vol. 11, pp. 256–258.
 J.W. Clark and T.M. Hughes, The Life and Letters of the Reverend Adam Sedgwick, Cambridge University Press: 1890; vol. 1, pp. 73–75.
 J. Gascoigne, Cambridge in the Age of Enlightenment, 1989, pp. 226–227, p. 232, p. 234, p. 243.
 P. Searby, A History of the University of Cambridge, vol. 3 (1750–1870), ed. C.N.L. Brooke et al., 1997. pp. 309–310.
 Oxford Dictionary of National Biography, vol. 30, eds. H. C. G. Matthew and B. Harrison, 2004, p. 645.

1756 births
1807 deaths
Welsh mathematicians
Senior Wranglers
Alumni of St John's College, Cambridge
Alumni of Trinity College, Cambridge